Paynes Creek Historic State Park is a Florida State Park located on Lake Branch Road one-half mile southeast of Bowling Green, Florida. On November 21, 1978, it was added to the United States National Register of Historic Places, under the title of  Payne's Creek Massacre-Fort Chokonikla Site (also known as "site of Chokonikla blockhouse and bridge" or "Military cemetery").

History

After the Second Seminole War
When the Second Seminole War ended in 1842, the federal Armed Occupation Act was passed. It let Seminole War veterans apply for a  homestead in Florida.

At the same time, a reservation was created for the Seminoles in southwest Florida. Their ability to trade was limited by the government, so as to prevent them from obtaining weapons to cause further conflict. To compensate, white-run trading stores were permitted on the reservation's outskirts to the north and west, letting the Indians obtain supplies and luxuries unavailable within the reservation.

Many of the trading posts were built by Kennedy and Darling, two army sutlers from Fort Brooke who had started their own trading company. One such was constructed in the late 1840s along the Charlo-popka-hatchee-chee (Little Trout-Eating Creek in Seminole), west of Peas Creek (later known as the Peace River), near present-day Bowling Green. The proprietors were Capt. George Payne and Dempsey Whidden.

The massacre
Ignoring the terms of the treaty with the Seminoles, settlers moved southward, encroaching on the reservation. Though Billy Bowlegs, one of their leaders, was reconciled to the state of affairs, others of his people were not so compliant.

On July 17, 1849, Payne and Whidden were killed by five renegade Seminoles, following which the store and everything in it was burned.

Fort Chokonikla

The attack on the trading post caused many of the settlers to flee to the nearest fort, then ask for military forces to be sent so they could return to their homes in safety. This led to the establishment of Fort Chokonikla near the site of the former trading post only three months later, on October 26. The fort's name is believed to derive from the Seminole "Chocka-nickler" meaning "burnt store". It was also variously spelled at the time as "Chokkonickla" or "Chokhonikla".

Following the fort's completion, the nearby creek became known as Paynes Creek, which it is still called to this day.

However, due to its location near a swamp, a breeding site for mosquitos, many of those stationed at the fort contracted and died of malaria. This became such a problem that the fort's doctor recommended the fort's closure. The army quickly agreed, and the fort was vacated on July 18, 1850, after less than nine months of occupancy, and a year and a day after Payne and Whidden's deaths.

Recreational activities
Activities include canoeing, kayaking, fishing, geocaching, and bird and butterfly watching. Amenities include a number of historic sites, three picnic pavilions, and a museum at the visitor's center that recreates pioneer life.

Hours
Florida state parks are open between 8 am and sundown every day of the year (including holidays).

References

External links

 Paynes Creek Historic State Park at Florida State Parks
 Paynes Creek State Historic Site at Absolutely Florida
 Hardee County listings at National Register of Historic Places
 Hardee County listings at Florida's Office of Cultural and Historical Programs
 Fort Chokonikla at Ghost Towns and History of the American West
 Fort Chokonikla at Cracker Barrel – Genealogy & History By Spessard Stone
 Allen C. Altvater webpage
 The Massacre at Payne’s Creek
 Chokonikla

State parks of Florida
Chokonikla
Parks in Hardee County, Florida
Seminole Wars
Ghost towns in Florida
Museums in Hardee County, Florida
History museums in Florida
Pre-statehood history of Florida
Protected areas established in 1978
Florida Native American Heritage Trail
Former populated places in Hardee County, Florida
National Register of Historic Places in Hardee County, Florida
Conflict sites on the National Register of Historic Places in Florida
1978 establishments in Florida